The , also known as “Milve”, is a municipal zoo opened in July 1967 in the city of Akita, Akita Prefecture, Japan.  Opened in 1972, the zoo covers 15 hectares, with 114 species on display. It is accredited by the Japanese Association of Zoos and Aquariums (JAZA).

The zoo is modeled after Asahiyama Zoo in Hokkaido with holding areas designed to mimic the animal’s natural habitat, and incorporating “action exhibits” where animal activity is encouraged, particularly during feeding time.

History
The zoo began as a zoo attached to the Akita Prefectural Children’s Hall within the grounds of former Kubota Castle in October 1950. It was transferred to the control of Akita City in April 1953 and renamed the Akita City Children’s Zoo, and "Monkey Train ride" was very popular. In September 1972, it was relocated to its present location.

The zoo successfully bred the tanuki in captivity in 1974, followed by the barn owl in 1978, and Japanese marten in 1994. It also successfully artificially inseminated the black-backed jackal in 1990 and demoiselle crane in 1995. All of these successes were the first time for a zoo in Japan.

In March 2015, the zoo recorded its 10 millionth visitor since its relocation to its present location.

Gallery

Akita Omoriyama Amusement Park Anipa

, is an amusement park located adjacent to Omoriyama Zoo. The facilities is owned and operated by the Hoei Sangyo Co. Ltd (豊永産業) in Osaka.

Attractions
Roller coaster of Giraffe Forest
Firebird Kurimu Ship Swing Ride
Jungle Circle Ferris wheel
Mirror House of Lamb Shian
Adventure Squad of Water Gun
Roundabout
Monorail of elephant Reguhon Jr. 
Jumping Stars of Rabbit Amber (Zamperla)
Pelican Bagan and Flying Magic Bikes (Zamperla)
Spaceship of Mouse Rasseto
Animal Train
Ampanman train

Parking lot
It can hold 430 cars and vehicles.

References

External links

  
Anipa website

Amusement parks in Japan
Tourist attractions in Akita Prefecture
Zoos in Japan
Museums in Akita Prefecture
Buildings and structures in Akita (city)
Zoos established in 1972
1972 establishments in Japan